Nikole Lowe (born 31 October 1973) is a British tattoo artist. She is best known for her appearances on the tattoo reality television show London Ink.

Biography
Nikole Lowe is originally from New Zealand. She first began tattooing in 1991 at Dermagraphic Tattoo Studio in Auckland's Ponsonby area, New Zealand. She had always planned on being a singer, not a tattoo artist. She opened up her own shop called Good Times Tattoo in London, United Kingdom.

She has tattooed Adam Ant, Daniel Johns of Silverchair, and Boy George.

References

External links
 
 Nikole Lowe on Discovery Channel
 Nikole Lowe on Myspace

Living people
British tattoo artists
New Zealand expatriates in England
1973 births